Insulantarctica is a biogeographic province of the  Antarctic Realm according to the classification developed by Miklos Udvardy in 1975. It comprises scattered islands of the Southern Ocean, which show clear affinity to each other. These islands belong to different countries. Some of them constitute UNESCO's  protected areas.

New Zealand Subantarctic Islands protected area (New Zealand):
Auckland Islands National Nature Reserve Ia
Campbell Islands National Nature Reserve Ia
Antipodes Islands National Nature Reserve Ia
Snares Islands National Nature Reserve Ia
Bounty Islands National Nature Reserve Ia
Auckland Islands Marine Mammal Sanctuary - Category unassigned
Territorial seas at Campbell, Antipodes, Snares and Bounty Islands - Category unassigned
Heard Island and McDonald Islands  (HIMI) protected area (Australia)
Macquarie Island (Australia), on World Heritage List since 1997
Kerguelen Islands protected area (France)
Tristan da Cunha Islands (United Kingdom), on World Heritage List since 1995
Prince Edward Islands protected area (South Africa)
Gough Island Wildlife Reserve (UK)

References

 Udvardy, M. D. F. (1975). A classification of the biogeographical provinces of the world. IUCN Occasional Paper no. 18. Morges, Switzerland: IUCN.
 Udvardy, Miklos D. F. (1975) "World Biogeographical Provinces" (Map). The CoEvolution Quarterly, Sausalito, California.
Clark, M. R. and Dingwall, P. R. (1985). "Conservation of islands in the Southern Ocean. A review of the protected areas of Insulantarctica." International Union for Conservation of Nature and Natural Resources. Cambridge University Press.

External links
Wcmc.org: New Zealand Subantarctic Islands 
Wcmc.org:  HIMI
Wcmc.org: Macquarie Island
Jncc.gov.uk: Tristan da Cunha Islands

.
Biogeography
Environment of Antarctica